Valley Road station is a light rail station in Milton, Massachusetts. It serves the MBTA's Ashmont–Mattapan High-Speed Line, a branch of the Red Line. The station is located off Eliot Street near Valley Road and consists of two side platforms that serve the lines's two tracks. Valley Road is the only station on the Line that is not accessible.

History

In 1932, local politicians advocated for the construction of a footbridge across the Neponset River to provide transit access to the Boston Consumptives Hospital from the station.

The whole line closed from June 24, 2006, to December 22, 2007, for a complete renovation. Unlike the other stations, Valley Road was not made accessible; its position below a hillside would have required a complex set of ramps. This was deemed too expensive for the stop, which has the second-lowest ridership of any MBTA rapid transit stop at just 44 daily riders. As part of a 2018 amendment to the settlement of Joanne Daniels-Finegold, et al. v. MBTA, the MBTA agreed to study whether and how to make the stop accessible.

References

External links

MBTA - Valley Road
 Eliot Street entrance from Google Maps Street View

Red Line (MBTA) stations
Railway stations in Norfolk County, Massachusetts
Railway stations in the United States opened in 1929
1929 establishments in Massachusetts